Rutpela maculata, the spotted longhorn, is a beetle species of flower longhorns of the family Cerambycidae, subfamily Lepturinae.

Varieties

Varieties within this species include:

Rutpela maculata var. calcarata   Olivier, 1790 
Rutpela maculata var. maculipes   Podaný, 1950 
Rutpela maculata var. nigricornis   (Stierlin, 1864) 
Rutpela maculata var. seminotata   Kaufman, 1947 
Rutpela maculata var. subbinotata   Podaný 
Rutpela maculata var. subsinuata   Depoli 
Rutpela maculata var. undulata   (Mulsant, 1839) 
Rutpela maculata var. subexternepunctata   Podaný 
Rutpela maculata var. parumnotata   Podaný 
Rutpela maculata var. subspinosa   Fabricius, 1792 
Rutpela maculata var. subundulata   Depoli, 1926 
Rutpela maculata var. subdisconotata   Podaný 
Rutpela maculata var. sinuata   Fabricius, 1792

Distribution
This beetle is widespread in most of Europe, in the eastern Palearctic realm, and in the Near East (Albania, Austria, Belgium, Bulgaria, Corsica, Croatia, Czech Republic, Denmark, Finland, France, Germany, Greece, Hungary, Italy, Luxembourg, Netherlands, Norway, Poland, Portugal, Romania, Russia, Sardinia, Serbia, Sicily, Slovakia, Slovenia, Spain, Sweden, Switzerland, Syria, Turkey, and the United Kingdom).

Description

The head and pronotum are dark-brown, while elytra are yellowish, with black dots and stripes, rough imitations of wasps, which probably gives them some protection from birds.

Biology
Adults can be encountered from May through August, completing their life cycle in two-three years. They only live two-four weeks. They are very common flower-visitors, especially Apiaceae species, feeding on pollen and the nectar. Larvae are polyphagous in deciduous trees, mainly feeding on Picea abies, Corylus avellana, Fagus sylvatica, Castanea sativa and Ostrya carpinifolia, as well as on Quercus, Carpinus, Salix, Alnus, Populus and Betula species.

See also
 Clytus arietis, another common wasp-mimicking longhorn beetle

References

External links
  Cerambycoidea

Lepturinae
Beetles of Europe
Beetles described in 1761
Taxa named by Nikolaus Poda von Neuhaus